Spetz is a surname of German origin, originating as a topographic name for someone who lived near a log road or wooden bridge. Notable people with the surname include:

Gustaf Spetz, Swedish singer
William Spetz (born 1996), Swedish comedian and television personality

See also
Spitz (surname)